Kachuli (also Romanized as Kachūlī; also known as ‘Abbās Qolīkhān and Kajūlī) is a village in Tajan Rural District, in the Central District of Sarakhs County, Razavi Khorasan Province, Iran. At the 2006 census, its population was 2,284, in 539 families.

References 

Populated places in Sarakhs County